Aplysinidae is a family of sea sponges in the order Verongiida. Its growths are either shaped like a fan or a club. Contained within the family are three recognized genera and six unrecognized ones. It was first authenticated and described by  Henry John Carter in 1875.

References 

Sponge families
Verongimorpha
Taxa named by Henry John Carter